Henson may refer to:


Places

United States
 Henson, Colorado, a ghost town
 Henson, Missouri, an unincorporated community
 Henson Creek, Colorado
 Henson Branch, Missouri, a stream

Antarctica
 Mount Henson, Ross Dependency

Other
 Henson (name), a given name and a surname, including a list of people with the name
 , an oceanographic survey ship
 Henson School of Science and Technology, Salisbury University, Salisbury, Maryland
 Henson Hall, an athletic facility at Dillard University, New Orleans, Louisiana
 Henson Aviation, original name of Piedmont Airlines

See also

 Henson Glacier, Antarctica
 Henson Glacier (Greenland)
 Henson Park, a multi-purpose sports ground in Marrickville, New South Wales, Australia
 Hanson (disambiguation)